FS ALe 642 is a class of Italian Electric Multiple Unit trains built from 1991 to 1995 for use on secondary lines and for commuter traffic. In service since 1991.

Description

This class is strictly derived from the previous ALe 582 and ALe 724 EMUs, sharing most of the mechanical and technical characteristics.
The main differences are in the electrical part (especially traction control and low tension circuitry) and for the presence of 2nd class only seatings.  The frontal part containing cabins consists of a preformed structure made of polyester reinforced with fiberglass.
They originally had the Navetta livery, painted in gray with orange and red lateral stripes; now they all have received the corporate green-white XMPR livery.

Technical description

Units arrangement
Like the previous EMUs on which they are based on, Class 642 can be divided in one or more sections containing a varying number of elements:
 ALe 642.001 ÷ 60, the engine units with driving cabins (64 seats, 67 t);
 Le 764.101 ÷ 140, non motorized carriage units (76 seats, 45 t);
 Le 682.001 ÷ 022, non motorized carriage units with driving cabin (68 seats, 46 t).
Each section must contain at least one ALe and one Le, with a driving cabin on each end; a train can be formed by a maximum of two sections coupled with Scharfenberg type automatic coupler.
Basic section arrangement are:
 M + R + Rp
 M + R + R + Rp
 M + R + R + M
 M + Rp
where "M" are ALe 642, "R" Le 764 and "Rp" Le 682.

Electrical description
Engine units employ four direct current traction motors placed inside the bogies, two for each one of them.

They are fed by choppers, one per bogie; unlike ALe 724, where the regulation is shunt-chopper type and a resistor is used when accelerating at low speeds, a full-chopper system is used as on ALe 582 with the only difference that, in this case, Class 642s are fitted with three-frequency choppers (582s employ single frequency ones).

Chopper regulation allows rheostatic braking (active above/until , about  if also using pneumatic braking) and the current generated by motors can be sent to the overhead supply line if there are other trains able to absorb it. An interlocking valve limits to 0.4 bars the pressure into the brake cylinders of the ALes when electrically braking.

Low tension circuitry employs 24 V batteries (110 V on ALe 724 and ALe 582) recharged by 380 V three-phase 70 kVA DC/AC static converters, located on engine units and Le 682 and which supply electric current to auxiliary services.

Composition 
ALe 642 complexes normally consist of two traction units (ALe 642) in multiple control and their trailers (Le 764), interspersed between the two units. One of the two traction units can be replaced by the pilot car (Le 682).

The possible compositions are as follows:

- ALe 642 + Le 764 + ALe 642

- ALe 642 + Le 764 + ALe 642

- ALe 642 + Le 682 *

- ALe 642 + Le 764 + Le 682 *

- ALe 642 + Le 764 + Le 764 + Le 682 *

(* the Le 682 cab car can be either at the head or tail end of the train, being equipped with a driver's cab and suitable for remote control of the traction units).

It is not possible to couple two traction units without intermediate trailers.

Allocation 
The ALe 642 group is assigned to the Pisa depot and operates short-range regional services in Tuscany on routes such as Livorno-Pisa-Pontedera, Pisa-Pontedera, Lucca-Pisa-Pontedera, Pisa-La Spezia, Livorno-Pisa-La Spezia, and La Spezia-Pontremoli.

Revamping 
Between the late 2000s and the beginning of the 2010s, Class 642s have received substantial upgrades in order to improve comfort and extend their service life; new modern seats were installed to replace the original ones, interior's color scheme was slightly changed, electronic screens showing trip info were also added, as well as an improved air conditioning system.
In addition to this, all units were fitted with the new SCMT (Sistema Controllo Marcia Treno) safety system, thus making the entire group compliant with the latest safety regulations..

Accidents 
On 25 May 2022, while waiting for departure on La Spezia Centrale platform n°1, ALe 642 044 unit suffered severe damage to its electrical part and interior due to a fire, which has also determined the evacuation of the train station with consequential delays and disruptions.

References

External links 

ALe 642
AnsaldoBreda multiple units
3000 V DC multiple units